Unconditional is the only studio album by American country music artist Clay Davidson, released in 2000 on Virgin Records Nashville. Its title track was a Top 5 hit on the Billboard Hot Country Singles & Tracks (now Hot Country Songs) charts in 2000. "I Can't Lie to Me" and "Sometimes" were also released from this album, both charting in the Top 30 on the same chart. Jude Cole and Scott Hendricks produced the album, with additional production from Chris Farren on "What Was I Thinking Of". To date, this remains Clay Davidson's only studio album as a solo artist.

Critical reception
William Ruhlmann of Allmusic rated the album three stars, comparing its sound to southern rock on some tracks but saying "there's nothing here that's particularly striking from a creative standpoint." Entertainment Weekly critic Alanna Nash rated it B+, comparing Davidson's vocals to Delbert McClinton and calling the album "a tender-tough charmer."

Track listing

Chart performance

References

2000 debut albums
Clay Davidson albums
Virgin Records albums
Albums produced by Scott Hendricks